The Federatión Española de Orientación (FEDO) is the national Orienteering Association in Spain. It is recognized as the  orienteering association for Spain by the International Orienteering Federation, of which it is a member.

References

External links
Official website of the Federatión Española de Orientación (FEDO)

Spain